Elena of Avalor is an American computer-animated adventure television series that premiered on Disney Channel on July 22, 2016, and moved to Disney Junior on July 14, 2018. The series features Aimee Carrero as the voice of Elena, a teenage Latina princess.

The series finale aired on August 23, 2020.

Series overview

Episodes

Season 1 (2016–17)

Season 2 (2017–19)

Season 3 (2019–20) 
Note: Starting with this season like the other Disney Junior shows from the time, episode title cards have been discontinued, but the titles are still spoken.

Shorts

Adventures in Vallestrella (2017) 
A short-form series titled Elena of Avalor: Adventures in Vallestrella premiered on Disney Junior on October 14, 2017, starring Elena and Isabel as they help baby Jaquins in Vallestrella.

Scepter Training with Zuzo (2018) 
A second short-form series debuted on Disney Junior on February 24, 2018. It involves Zuzo, Elena's animal spirit guide, training her to properly use and strengthen the strong powers of her Scepter of Light.

The Secret Life of Sirenas (2018) 
A third short-form series entitled The Secret Life of Sirenas follows the movie Song of the Sirenas, which features the Sirenas in their day-to-day lives. It debuted on Disney Junior on September 21, 2018.

Discovering the Magic Within (2019) 
A fourth short-form series entitled Discovering the Magic Within follows the special The Magic Within, which features Princess Elena and her family and friends dealing with her newly strengthened magical abilities. It debuted on Disney Junior on October 13, 2019.

See also 
 Elena and the Secret of Avalor, a crossover television film with Sofia the First, which premiered on November 20, 2016.

References 

Lists of American children's animated television series episodes
Lists of Disney Channel television series episodes